Orla Barry (born 21 September 1989) is an Irish discus thrower. Barry was born in Ladysbridge, County Cork, Republic of Ireland and competes in the F57 classification. She has won two Paralympic medals, and is a three time European champion (2012, 2016 and 2018) in the event. On 13 January 2020, Barry announced her retirement from Paralympic sports.

References

1989 births
Living people
Paralympic athletes of Ireland
Paralympic silver medalists for Ireland
Paralympic bronze medalists for Ireland
Sportspeople from County Cork
Medalists at the 2012 Summer Paralympics
Athletes (track and field) at the 2008 Summer Paralympics
Athletes (track and field) at the 2012 Summer Paralympics
Irish female discus throwers
Irish female shot putters
Medalists at the 2016 Summer Paralympics
Paralympic medalists in athletics (track and field)
Wheelchair discus throwers
Wheelchair shot putters
Paralympic discus throwers
Paralympic shot putters
20th-century Irish women
21st-century Irish women